Sa Dulo ng Walang Hanggan (International title: Till Eternity's End / ) is a Philippine primetime teleserye aired from March 26, 2001, to February 28, 2003, by ABS-CBN replacing Saan Ka Man Naroroon and was replaced by  Darating ang Umaga. This was Claudine Barretto's first show without her loveteam partner Rico Yan, and Agassi's first pairing with Claudine.

During this time period Barretto’s Primetime Power to hold High Ratings in Mega Manila and Internationally abroad through The Filipino Channel Claudine became a staple of Protagonist TV Queens earning her right so after the Highly successful Saan Ka Man Naroroon stint as the three triplets.

Synopsis 
The story revolves around Ángelina (1912) / Angeline Montenegro (2001) (Claudine Barretto) in the early years of her life. In the beginning of the present generation, a new love story awaits when Angeline, who lives a very normal life, has problems when Sally (Mylene Dizon) comes into the household and starts making those around her miserable. Sally takes her anger out on everyone only to find out that once and for all, only love and truth will prevail. In the end, Angeline must face the truth as to who is the man fated to love her amongst Miguel, Clarence, or Benjie (Benedicto from the past in 1912).

Sa Dulo ng Walang Hanggan opens in Bulacan in 1912, where the town's President Municipal, Don Teodoro (Ronaldo Valdez) has just announced the betrothal of his eldest son Alfonso (Bernard Palanca) to the lovely Angelina, who was persuaded to agree to the engagement by her mother, Consuelo (Tetchie Agbayani) in order to free her father, Sebastian (Spanky Manikan), a bandido accused of killing an American supporter. Despite agreeing to the marriage, however, Angelina has one little secret: Her heart really belongs to another man, Alfonso's brother, Benedict (Carlos Agassi), a sensitive musician who was also Angelina's childhood sweetheart.

The action then flashes forward to the present day, where another betrothal is being announced as prosperous couple Norberto (Robert Arevalo) and Corazon (Boots Anson-Roa) oversee the engagement party for their daughter Angeline and Hector (Troy Montero), the handsome son of Menardo (Jaime Fabregas), one of Norberto's business associates. As an engagement gift, Angelina's parents buy her and Hector a rest house in Bulacan - the same one where Angelina and Alfonso were affianced all those years ago!

But what threads bind the present to that distant past? Only one witness remains: Lola Carmela/Mameng (Gloria Romero), the house's current caretaker and the keeper of a mysterious locket that may be the key that unlocks the complicated story between Angeline, Alfonso and Benedict.

Cast and characters

Main cast 
 Claudine Barretto as Ángelina / Angeline Montenegro-Crisostomo
 Carlos Agassi as Benedicto / Benjamin "Benjie" Ilagan
 Luis Alandy as Clarence Cristobal
 Mylene Dizon as Susan / Sara / Sally Concepción

Special participation
 Gloria Romero as Lola Carmela "Mameng" Estocapio

Supporting cast 
 Helen Gamboa as Nelia Santos
 Ronaldo Valdez as Teodoro / Don Miguel Crisostomo, Sr.
 Leandro Muñoz as Miguel "MJ" Crisostomo, Jr. / Miguelito
 Pilar Pilapil as Adora Evangelista
 Robert Arevalo as Norberto Montenegro
 Boots Anson-Roa as Corazon Montenegro
 Victor Neri as Joaquin Montenegro
 Eugene Domingo as Simang Bernardo / Old Niknik Bernardo (final episode)
 Jojit Lorenzo as Gaspar Bernardo
 Matet de Leon as Lucila "Lucy" Ilagan-Cristobal
 Emilio Garcia as Raul Ilagan
 Dennis Trillo as Jojo Ilagan
 Ena Garcia as Niknik Bernardo

Special role
 Bernard Palanca as Alfonso

Recurring and guest cast 
 Alma Moreno as Mayor Socorro Bustamante
 Justin Cuyugan as Dondie Leviste
 Glydel Mercado as Amelia
 Spanky Manikan† as Don Sebastian Agbayani
 Gladys Reyes as Ruella Agbayani
 Tetchie Agbayani as Consuelo Vanguardia
 Shamaine Centenera-Buencamino as Dra. Veronica dela Cruz 
 Carol Banawa and Dianne dela Fuente as Minerva Soriano
 John Lloyd Cruz as Emilio "Emil" Bustamante
 Jaime Fabregas as Menandro Soriano
 Troy Montero as Hector Soriano
 Gina Pareño as Lita Cristobal
 Tommy Abuel as Delfin Cristobal
 Danilo Barrios as Dong
 Camille Prats as Terry
 Ricky Belmonte† as Badong
 Christian Vasquez as Matthew Monteclaro
 Gretchen Barretto as Andrea Crisostomo / Sabrina Vanguardia
 Adrian Albert as Miguel "Thirdy" Crisostomo III
 Jane Oineza as Arabella Crisostomo
 Dennis Roldan as Dr. Anton dela Cruz
 Nestor De Villa† as Gov. Federico Bustamante
 Kaye Abad as Sophia B. Ilagan
 Susan Africa as Christina Tiongson
 Juan Rodrigo as Efren Wilwayco
 Ciara Sotto as Barbara Wilwayco
 Frances Makil-Ignacio as Tamara Sembrano
 Candy Pangilinan as Gundina
 William Martinez as Mark
 Yayo Aguila as Esther
 Alfred Vargas as Lauro
 Dan Alvaro as Lawin
 Irma Adlawan as Mercy
 Georgina Sandico as Ariane
 Neil Ryan Sese as Neil

In other media and popular culture
 Sa Dulo ng Walang Hanggan also aired through ABS-CBN's local radio stations from 2001 to 2003 throughout its run. The radio version airs the episodes from the previous evening that have already aired, thus serving as a rerun.
 Dianne Dela Fuente, fresh from the hit teleserye Pangako Sa 'Yo, replaced Carol Banawa as Minerva in the latter part of the series. Minerva wasn't seen again until the halfway through the series and by the time Minerva was needed, Carol Banawa was busy with her new soap Bituin.
 Rico Yan was originally going to play Benjie/Benedicto but turned down the role due to his commitments, which includes the noontime show Magandang Tanghali Bayan and the sitcom Whattamen. The role went to Carlos Agassi instead. After turning down the role, however, Yan was offered again to be part of the soap, this time playing the part of MJ/Miguel Jr. It was reported that upon his return from Lenten vacation in Palawan, he was to start taping for the series.  Unfortunately, he died while on vacation on March 29, 2002.  Leandro Munoz took over the role intended for Rico. 
 Claudine Barretto wore a necklace given to her by a fan as a sign of gratitude.
 Sa Dulo ng Walang Hanggan had a stellar cast and used Gladys Reyes again as Villain to Claudine Barretto's character while she was still casting in Recuerdo de Amor.
 Mylene Dizon, was typecast as main antagonist and was recognized by many viewers as the one who made Claudine Barretto's life miserable.
 The series' theme song was used again for another soap called Walang Hanggan in the same network. Helen Gamboa was part of both series.
 Ayegee Paredes, the interpreter of the theme song, later became a contestant in Talentadong Pinoy on TV5 in 2012. She was first discovered in a regional singing contest, "Awitanghalan" in 1997.
 In the 2002 film Super B, Rufa Mae Quinto's character screams at her nemesis, played by Mylene Dizon, "Palagi mo na lang sinasaktan at pinapapahirapan si Claudine!" ("You always keep hurting and making Claudine's life miserable!") in reference to the character Sally in the TV Drama
 Hero Angeles appeared in the series prior to joining Star Circle Quest as a teen questor.
 The series was Dennis Trillo's first TV major appearance before moving to GMA-7.
 This is the last television series of Ricky Belmonte. He died in 2001.
This is the last television show of Leandro Muñoz before he and his family migrated to the United States in 2003.

See also
List of programs aired by ABS-CBN
List of telenovelas of ABS-CBN

References

External links 
 

ABS-CBN drama series
2001 Philippine television series debuts
2003 Philippine television series endings
Filipino-language television shows
Television shows set in the Philippines